América Futebol Clube, commonly known as América, was a Brazilian football team based in Vitória, Espírito Santo state. They won the Campeonato Capixaba six times.

History
The club was founded on November 25, 1917. They won the Campeonato Capixaba in 1917, 1922, 1923, 1925, 1927, and in 1928. América eventually folded.

Achievements

 Campeonato Capixaba:
 Winners (6): 1917, 1922, 1923, 1925, 1927, 1928

Stadium
América Futebol Clube played their home games at Estádio Joaquim Calmon. The stadium had a maximum capacity of 4,000 people.

References

Association football clubs established in 1917
Defunct football clubs in Espírito Santo
1917 establishments in Brazil